Stéphane Rideau (born 25 July 1976) is a French actor. Although intending to pursue a career in sports, he was discovered in 1992 at a rugby game and then auditioned for a role in the film Les Roseaux sauvages (Wild Reeds) by André Téchiné. He was, at the time, sixteen years old.

He later played the role of a gay teenager in Presque rien (Come Undone) directed by Sébastien Lifshitz. Rideau has a long acting experience that includes the films Loin, Le Ventre de Juliette, Le Clan and Le Cadeau d'Élena. He currently lives with his partner Celia and their daughter.

Filmography

External links
 Official website of Stéphane Rideau
 
 

1976 births
Living people
People from Agen
French male film actors
French male television actors
20th-century French male actors
21st-century French male actors